Zbigniew Zakrzewski may refer to:

 Zbigniew Zakrzewski (footballer) (born 1981), Polish footballer
 Zbigniew Zakrzewski (economist) (1912–1992), Polish economist